Rustenburg Airfield , licensed according to South African Civil Aviation Authority standards, is a municipal airport situated near Rustenburg in the North West province of South Africa.

Facilities

Communication 
The Communication Frequency for Rustenburg Airfield is 122.4

Rustenburg SkyDiving Club 
The airfield is home to Rustenburg SkyDiving Club, a Parachute Association of South Africa licensed drop zone.

Nearby airports
 Pilanesberg International Airport
 Lanseria International Airport

Nearby attractions
 Sun City
 Pilanesberg Game Reserve
 SkyDive Rustenburg

See also
 Parachute Association of South Africa PASA
 South African Civil Aviation Authority SA CAA

References

External links
 SkyDive Rustenburg
 Rustenburg Life Weather Station
 Rustenburg Airfield Weather info

Airports in South Africa
Transport in North West (South African province)
Buildings and structures in North West (South African province)
Rustenburg